Enkeleitä ja pikkupiruja is a Finnish television series. It aired on Finnish TV in 1998.

Cast 
 Tarja Saikkonen – Annikki Tuiskula, koulun rehtori, äiti
 Saku Kautto – Jussi Tuiskula, isä
 Salla Häkkinen – Inkeri Tuiskula, perheen esikoinen
 Ronnie Andersson – Tuukka Tuiskula, kuudesluokkalainen
 Matias Arosuo – Jaakko Tuiskula, kolmasluokkalainen
 Joona Moilanen – Petteri Tuiskula, perheen kuopus
 Inkeri Kivimäki – Katariina Jantti, äiti
 Kauko Lindfors – Pekka Jantti, isä
 Riina Sivén – Henna Jantti, kuudesluokkalainen
 Tuomas Närvä – Markus Jantti, kolmasluokkalainen
 Aaro Partanen – Leevi Pelkonen, isä
 Elina Lehtisalmi – Marianne Pelkonen, äiti
 Heli Partanen – Maria Pelkonen, kuudesluokkalainen
 Mikko Lempinen – Samuel Pelkonen, kolmasluokkalainen
 Teijo Eloranta – Aulis Toivola, isä
 Riikka Luoma – Tanja Toivola, kuudesluokkalainen
 Enni Tuovinen – Milla Toivola, kolmasluokkalainen
 Auni Tuovinen – Niina Toivola, kolmasluokkalainen
 Kirsti Kuosmanen – Reettamari Uusikylä, äiti
 Joni Virtanen – Ossi Uusikylä, kuudesluokkalainen
 Peppe Forsblom – Jacob Sandberg, isä
 Satu Hindrea – Maija Sandberg, äiti
 Henri Valonen – Kim Sandberg, kuudesluokkalainen
 Linda Wallgren – Janica Sandberg, kolmasluokkalainen

See also
List of Finnish television series

External links
 

Finnish television shows
1998 Finnish television series debuts
1998 Finnish television series endings
1990s Finnish television series
Yle original programming